Deshamanya Rohan de Saram (born 9 March 1939) is a British-born Sri Lankan cellist. Until his 30s, he made his name as a classical artist, but has since become renowned for his involvement in and advocacy of contemporary music. He travels widely and is much in demand for workshops and summer schools in addition to sustaining a schedule of adventurously programmed concerts.

Biography
Rohan de Saram was born to Ceylonese parents in Sheffield, Yorkshire, England. His father was Robert de Saram and his mother was Miriam Pieris Deraniyagala. His paternal grandfather was Colonel Fredrick de Saram, OBE and his maternal grandfather was Sir Paul Pieris. At age 11, he studied with Gaspar Cassadó in Siena and Florence. In 1955 at the age of 16, he was the first winner of the Guilhermina Suggia Award, enabling him to study in the UK with Sir John Barbirolli and in Puerto Rico with Pablo Casals. Casals said of him, "There are few of his generation that have such gifts". In the following year, he won a Harriet Cohen International Music Award.

At the invitation of Dimitri Mitropoulos, who described him in 1957 as "a rare genius...a born musician... an amazing...cellist", Rohan was invited to give his Carnegie Hall debut in 1960 with the New York Philharmonic, playing Khachaturian's Cello Concerto under the baton of Stanisław Skrowaczewski.   Gregor Piatigorsky presented him with a special bow.  He has lived in London since 1972, first and foremost as a performer, although he has also taught at Trinity College of Music, London. From 1979 to 2005, de Saram was a member of the Arditti Quartet, but now works with other artists to pursue his own artistic vision.  He has also toured and recorded with Markus Stockhausen's "Possible Worlds" group.  He worked personally with Zoltán Kodály, Francis Poulenc, Sir William Walton, and Dmitri Shostakovich.  He has performed with the major orchestras of Europe, USA, Canada, Australia and the former Soviet Union with conductors such as Barbirolli, Sir Adrian Boult, Zubin Mehta, Seiji Ozawa, and William Steinberg.

In ensemble or as a soloist, he has premiered works by Luciano Berio, Bose, Benjamin Britten, Sylvano Bussotti, John Cage, Sir Peter Maxwell Davies, Philip Glass, Sofia Gubaidulina, Paul Hindemith, Mauricio Kagel, György Ligeti (Racine 19), Conlon Nancarrow, Henri Pousseur, Wolfgang Rihm, Jeremy Dale Roberts (Deathwatch Cello Concerto, written for de Saram), Alfred Schnittke, Iannis Xenakis (Kottos ) and Toshio Hosokawa (the concerto Chant for cello and orchestra).  Berio was  so impressed by his performance of Il Ritorno degli Snovidenia that he wrote Sequenza XIV (2002) specially for de Saram, incorporating drumming on the body of the cello drawn from de Saram's skills with the Kandyan drum.  The work was given its world and numerous national premieres by de Saram who then also made the premiere recording.   He plays the standard classical cello works, including the great concerti, sonata cycles and Bach's six Solo Cello Suites.

He founded the De Saram Clarinet Trio and a duo with his brother Druvi de Saram.  He is one of relatively few new music interpreters to have explored the world of improvisation. From roughly 1986-1994, he occasionally worked with the UK improvising ensemble AMM, appearing on their recording "The Inexhaustible Document", recorded in 1987.

He has made numerous recordings, both with the Arditti Quartet and as a soloist, including Vivaldi's Sonatas, Edmund Rubbra's Soliloquy for cello and orchestra, Britten's Cello Suites No 1-3, John Mayer's Ragamalas and Prabhanda, Xenakis' Kottos and Elliott Carter's Figment I and II, and works by Bernd Alois Zimmermann, Peter Ruzicka, Gelhaar, Pröve and Steinke. 2011 releases include Harmonic Labyrinth with Preethi de Silva, and the first of two volumes of de Saram in Concert featuring magnificent Wigmore Hall performances of the Kodaly Sonata for Solo Cello (his score carries Kodaly's hand-written praise for his performance before the composer in May 1960), together with the Rachmaninoff Cello Sonata, in which he is accompanied by his brother Druvi.

Personal life
He is married to Rosemary de Saram. They have a daughter, Sophia (Oberon Symphony Orchestra) and a son, Suren (of Bombay Bicycle Club).

Honours
In December 2004, Rohan de Saram was awarded an honorary Doctorate of Letters (D.Litt.) from the University of Peradeniya, Sri Lanka. In December 2005 he received the Deshamanya, a national honour of Sri Lanka, given by the President of Sri Lanka.

References

External links

British cellists
Sinhalese musicians
English people of Sri Lankan descent
Living people
1939 births
Deshamanya